Rabrovo may refer to:
 Rabrovo, Bulgaria, in Boynitsa Municipality
 Rabrovo, Valandovo, North Macedonia
 Rabrovo (Kučevo), Serbia

See also 
 Rebrovo, Bulgaria